The 1991 Omloop Het Volk was the 45th edition of the Omloop Het Volk cycle race and was held on 2 March 1991. The race started and finished in Ghent. The race was won by Andreas Kappes.

General classification

References

1991
Omloop Het Nieuwsblad
Omloop Het Nieuwsblad
Omloop Het Nieuwsblad